Berghia norvegica is a species of sea slug, an aeolid nudibranch. It is a shell-less marine gastropod mollusc in the family Aeolidiidae.

Distribution
Berghia norvegica was described from Trondheim Fjord. It is known only from a few localities in Norway.

Ecology
This nudibranch feeds on the sea anemone Gonactinia prolifera.

References

Aeolidiidae
Gastropods described in 1939
Endemic fauna of Norway